Emmure is an American metalcore band. The group formed in 2003 in New Fairfield, Connecticut, but later moved to Queens, New York. The discography of Emmure consists of eight full-length albums, one EP and three demos.

Studio albums

EPs

Demos

Surrounded By Nothing  
 Released: 2004
 Label: Dead People Ink Records
 Format: CDr, Promo
 Information: The band's first ever demo. Many of the songs would later get re-recorded under new titles for some of the band's later releases, such as the band's Nine Eleven Zero Four demo and their EP The Complete Guide to Needlework.

Track list:
 Symbols of Destruction
 One Mind
 Crystal Heart
 Angels Cry Forever
 Never Fade
 Dying Dream
 Erasing Tomorrow
 Burning Bridges
 Bitter Sweet
 Nothing But Me

Nine Eleven Zero Four 
 Released: 2004
 Label: Self-released
 Format: CD-R
 Information: was released/sold in a slimline CD case with an image of a deceased cupid as the cover art. The name of the demo is a tribute to the Lionel brother's friend who died on the date September 11, 2004. Guitarist Jesse Ketive engineered/produced all three songs.

Track list:
 If God Only Knew
 Green Is the Worst Color Ever
 Mr. Know It All But No One Asks Me the Right Questions

Untitled Demo 2005 
 Released: 2005
 Label: Self-released
 Format: CDr, Promo
 Information: Demo recorded at GRS Studios in New York City. All 3 tracks are early demo versions of songs that would later get re-recorded for The Complete Guide to Needlework. The track titled "Untitled" would later acquire the name "22 Exits Away" for the EP.

Track list:
 I Should Have Called Mrs. Cleo
 Untitled 
 Johnny Carson Didn't Have To Die

Singles 

"Gypsy Disco" (2020)
"Sons of Medusa" (2021)

Music videos

Collaborations

References

Heavy metal group discographies
Discographies of American artists